Jan Sander Lauridsen (born 18 January 1963 in Denmark) is a Danish retired footballer.

Career

Before playing football, Lauridsen played handball in Spain and for Denmark internationally. Upon returning from Spain, he played amateur football but soon successfully trialed with top flight side Aarhus Gymnastikforening after scoring many goals during 1 game for his amateur team. After helping Aarhus Gymnastikforening win the league, Lauridsen made his solitary appearance for the Denmark national team, during a 1–1 draw with Germany. However, he retired at the age of 28 due to injury. Following retirement, Lauridsen returned to playing handball.

References

External links
 

Danish men's footballers
Living people
Association football forwards
1963 births
Danish male handball players
Viborg FF players
Aarhus Gymnastikforening players
Denmark international footballers
Footballers from Aarhus